Malou is a German 2019 social short film drama starring Romina Küper, Veronica Ferres and Charles Rettinghaus, directed by Adi Wojaczek and produced by Patrick Mölleken.

The film celebrated its world premiere on July 19, 2019 at the 23rd LA Shorts International Film Festival in Los Angeles and was screened at the TCL Chinese Theatre in Hollywood in August 2019 as part of the 15th HollyShorts Film Festival's official selection.

Malou has been selected as a finalist at the Oscar-qualifying 22nd Manhattan Short Film Festival 2019 while prevailing against more than 1,250 submission from 70 countries.

Plot
The young passionate dancer Malou is irresistible fighting for her dream of a career on the big stage. After years of struggle and rejection she suddenly receives her one chance at life – leading up to an unexpected reveal.

Cast
Romina Küper as Malou
Veronica Ferres as Regina Vollmer
Charles Rettinghaus as Prof. Josef Berns
Matilda Herzog as Young Girl
Patrick Mölleken as Michael
Lilly Krug as Milena

Production
Malou is a German film production that was shot in North Rhine-Westphalia, Germany. Among others the Folkwang University of the Arts in Essen-Werden as well as the Düsseldorfer Schauspielhaus served as its film sets.

Awards & Film Festivals

 Official Selection – 7th Annual NoHo Cinefest 2020
 Official Selection – 1st Filmoramax International Film Festival 2020
 Official Selection – 21st Newport Beach Film Festival 2020
 Official Selection – 4th Cordillera International Film Festival 2020
 Official Selection – 12th Go Short - International Short Film Festival Nijmegen 2020
 Official Selection – 44th Cleveland International Film Festival (CIFF) 2020
 Official Selection – 10th Awareness Film Festival 2019
 Finalist – 22nd Manhattan Short Film Festival 2019
 Official Selection – 15th HollyShorts Film Festival 2019
 Official Selection – 23rd LA Shorts International Film Festival 2019

References

External links

2019 films
2019 drama films
2019 short films
German drama films
2010s German-language films
Films about disability
2010s German films